Shunyasampadane (Kannada: ಶೂನ್ಯಸಂಪಾದನೆ Śūnyasampādane) is an anthology of poems in the Kannada language that includes the vachanas and dialogues of several Lingayat saints.  It is an important part of the holy scriptures of Lingayats. The word Shunyasampadane can be roughly translated as "the acquisition of nothing" in which Shunya translates to "nothingness", "void" or "empty". The more precise translation is 'the Graduated Attainment of the Divine Void'. It is part of the important concepts associated with enlightenment in the Indian traditions.  

A record of the dialogues of various saints, the Shoonya Sampadane is a collection of vachanas of the important vacanakaras of the 12th century. The story follows the life and times of the holy mystic Allama Prabhu along his way to Kalyana city to meet Basava and the other Shivasharanas. The editors of the Shoonya Sampadane have woven through narrative the vachanas into a cohesive structure around an available or a new story. There are a total of five versions of the Shoonya Sampadane, of which the first four were composed between 15th and 16th century. The fourth version was edited and printed by P.G. Halakatti in 1930. The last version was edited and printed by Dr. GV Jaya Rajashekhar in 2003.

Editions

It is accepted today that there are a total of five Shoonya Sampadane works. Mahadevayya was the first one to compose a Shoonya Sampadane in early-15th century. He collated the vachanas of some of the major vachana composers as a series of dramatic narratives. Subsequently, others revised and re-presented his work. In early-16th century, Haligeya Deva, or his student Kenchavirannodeyaru, compiled the second version, adding a new section on Siddharama’s initiation at the hands of Chennabasava. A third version was produced around later by Gummalapurada Siddhalingayati, who mainly added more vachanas to each of the sections, as well as adding new episodes to the debates. The fourth version of the Shoonya Sampadane was edited by Goolur Siddhaveera. The Fifth and the latest version of Shoonya Sampadane was edited by Dr.GV Jaya Rajashekhar. All five versions follow a basic pattern, but make recognisable changes in interpretations both in terms of selection of the vachanas and composition of incidents.

20th-century editions
Halakatti, P.G., ed. 1930. Guluru Siddavirana Shoonyasampadane.
Basavaraju, L, ed. 1969. Shivaganaprasadi Mahadevayyana Prabhudevara Shoonyasampadane. Chitradurga: Shri Brahanmatha Samsthana.
Vidyashankar, S., and G.S. Siddalingaiah, eds. 1998. Halageyaryana Shoonaysampadane. Bangalore: Priyadarshini Prakashana.
Nandimath, S.C., L.M.A. Menezes, and R.C. Hiremath, eds. 1965. [Gūḷūra Siddhavīrēśvara’s] Śūnyasaṃpādane: Volume I to V. Dharawar: Karnatak University. (It contains the original text and its English translation)
Jaya Rajashekhar, G.V., eds. 2003. Prabhudevara Shoonyasampadane. Bangalore: Siri Prakashana.

Further reading
 Nandimath, S.C., L.M.A. Menezes, and R.C. Hiremath, eds. 1965. [Gūḷūra Siddhavīrēśvara’s] Śūnyasaṃpādane: Volume I. Dharawar: Karnatak University.
 Bhoosanuramath, S.S., and Armando Menezes, eds. 1968. [Gūḷūra Siddhavīrēśvara’s] Śūnyasaṃpādane: Volume II. Dharawar: Karnatak University.
Bhoosanuramath, S.S., and Armando Menezes, eds. 1969. [Gūḷūra Siddhavīrēśvara’s] Śūnyasaṃpādane: Volume III. Dharawar: Karnatak University.
 Jaya Rajashekhar, G.V, ed 1992. Shoonyasampadaneyalli Sthri pathragalu, Bangalore: Basava Samithi.
 Sri Kumarswamiji. 1993a. “The Genesis of Shunya Sampadane –I.” In Veerashaivism: Comparative Study of Allama Prabhu and Basava, Shunyasampadhane and Vachanshastra, edited by S. Munavalli. Dharwad.
 Sri Kumarswamiji. 1993b. Veerashaivism: Comparative Study of Allama Prabhu and Basava, Shunyasampadhane and Vachanshastra. Edited by S. Munavalli. Dharwad.
Ayyappapanicker, K. 1997. Medieval Indian Literature: Surveys and selections. New Delhi: Sahitya Akademi.
 Jaya Rajashekhar, G.V, ed. 1998. Shoonyasampadaneya Sangraha,Bangalore:Kannada Sahithya Parishad.
Ullagaddi, Saroja. "Shoonya Sampadane." http://www.vsna-tx.org/2007/WaniMarch07-1.pdf
 Jaya Rajashekhar, G.V, ed 2010. Shoonyasampadaneya sharaniyaru, Bhalki: Basava Dharma Prachara Samsthe,Hiremath Samsthana.
 Jaya Rajashekhar, G.V, ed. 2013. Shoonyasampadaneya Antharangada Drushyagalu, Bhalki: Basava Dharma Prachara Samsthe,Hiremath Samsthana.
 “The Genesis of Shunya Sampadane I - Welcome to Spiritual World of Veerashaiva’s.” n.d. Accessed December 16, 2014. http://www.virashaiva.com/the-genesis-of-shunya-sampadane-i/.

References and notes

Lingayatism
Kannada literature

|}